The 1987 Team Ice Racing World Championship was the ninth edition of the Team World Championship. The final was held on ?, 1987, in Heerenveen in the Netherlands. The Soviet Union won their seventh title.

Classification

See also 
 1987 Individual Ice Speedway World Championship
 1987 Speedway World Team Cup in classic speedway
 1987 Individual Speedway World Championship in classic speedway

References 

Ice speedway competitions
World